Massachusetts House of Representatives' 15th Norfolk district in the United States is one of 160 legislative districts included in the lower house of the Massachusetts General Court. It covers part of Brookline in Norfolk County. Since 2019, Tommy Vitolo of the Democratic Party has represented the district.

The current district geographic boundary overlaps with that of the Massachusetts Senate's 1st Middlesex and Norfolk district.

Representatives
 Marty Linsky
 Bruce H. Zeiser 
 Royall H. Switzler
 John A. Businger, 1979-1999 
 Ronny M. Sydney
 Frank Israel Smizik
 Tommy Vitolo, 2019-current

See also
 List of Massachusetts House of Representatives elections
 List of Massachusetts General Courts
 Other Norfolk County districts of the Massachusetts House of Representatives: 1st, 2nd, 3rd, 4th, 5th, 6th, 7th, 8th, 9th, 10th, 11th, 12th, 13th, 14th
 List of former districts of the Massachusetts House of Representatives

Images
Portraits of legislators

References

External links
 Ballotpedia
  (State House district information based on U.S. Census Bureau's American Community Survey).

House
Government of Norfolk County, Massachusetts